Tim McNulty (born 1966) of County Meath, Republic of Ireland is a rally driver. Rallying in his Subaru Impreza S12B WRC, McNulty in the same 2011 season won both the Irish Tarmac Rally Championship and Ireland’s Dunlop National Rally in a historic motorsports first. In anticipation of the Todd’s Leap Ulster Rally earlier in the season, fellow rally driver Derrick McGarrity stated of McNulty “Tim is always a hard man to beat, very competitive and very committed, and he should have a slight advantage with his S12 Subaru which has the edge in power over the S11 I’m driving this time,”

See also
Rally of the Lakes
Eugene Donnelly
Cork 20 Rally
2007 Rally Ireland
Donegal International Rally

References

External links
  racing profile

Irish rally drivers
1970 births
Living people